Musa Auwal Yahaya (born 16 December 1997) is a Nigerian professional footballer who plays as a defender for Bosnian club Radnik Hadžići.

Club career
Born in Kaduna, Northern Nigeria, Musa started his football career at Mutunchi Academy before he was selected to represent Nigeria at the 2013 FIFA U-17 World Cup. Musa made his debut on 28 February 2016 in the Segunda Liga after coming on as a 46th minute replacement for Theo Ryuki.

On 22 July 2021, he signed a two-year contract with Académico de Viseu.

International career
Musa has represented Nigeria at major international tournaments including the 2013 FIFA U-17 World Cup and 2015 FIFA U-20 World Cup.

Career statistics

References

External links

1997 births
Sportspeople from Kaduna
Living people
Nigerian footballers
Association football midfielders
Nigeria youth international footballers
Nigeria under-20 international footballers
Portimonense S.C. players
FC Porto B players
F.C. Vizela players
Académico de Viseu F.C. players
Liga Portugal 2 players
Nigerian expatriate footballers
Nigerian expatriate sportspeople in Portugal
Expatriate footballers in Portugal